Prasophyllum ovale, commonly known as the little leek orchid, is a species of orchid endemic to the south-west of Western Australia. It is a small leek orchid with a single smooth, tubular leaf and up to twenty or more white, green and brown flowers with the labellum only slightly upturned.

Description
As with others in the genus, the flowers are inverted so that the labellum is above the column rather than below it. The sepals and petals turn forwards and the lateral sepals are free from each other. The labellum is turned only slightly upwards and has a slightly frilly edge. Flowering occurs from September to October.

Taxonomy and naming
The little leek orchid was first formally described in 1840 by John Lindley and the description was published in A Sketch of the Vegetation of the Swan River Colony. The specific epithet (ovale) is a Latin word meaning "oval", referring to the shape of the labellum.

Distribution and habitat
The little leek orchid  grows in woodland between New Norcia and Mount Barker in the Avon Wheatbelt, Esperance Plains, Jarrah Forest and Swan Coastal Plain biogeographic regions.

Conservation
Prasophyllum ovale is classified as "not threatened" by the Western Australian Government Department of Parks and Wildlife.

References

External links 
 

ovale
Endemic flora of Western Australia
Endemic orchids of Australia
Plants described in 1840